Guillaumont is a French surname. Notable people with the surname include:
Antoine Guillaumont (1915–2000), French archaeologist
Robert Guillaumont (born 1933), French chemist

See also
Charles-Axel Guillaumot (1730–1807), French architect

French-language surnames